Englerophytum paludosum is an evergreen tree species in the family Sapotaceae. The species was first described in 2016, wherein its 50-cm trunk bears an edible fruit. Having a native range from southern Nigeria, to the Democratic Republic of Congo, this species was named after the swamp-forest habitat it was discovered.

References

paludosum